The Three Great Shrines of Benzaiten (日本三大弁天) are a group of Japanese shrines dedicated to the worship of the goddess Benzaiten. During the Meiji Era separation of Shinto and Buddhism the veneration of the Buddhist water-goddess Benzaiten was replaced by the veneration of the Munakata sanjojin (宗像三女神), three Shinto goddesses of the sea. The official veneration of Benzaiten was moved to separate Buddhist temples. They are traditionally enumerated as follows:

 Daigan-ji Temple / Itsukushima Shrine, Hiroshima Prefecture
 Enoshima Shrine, Kanagawa Prefecture
 Hōgon-ji Temple / Tsukubusuma Shrine, Shiga Prefecture

References
「弁才天」 『世界大百科事典 第２版』　Heibonsha, 2006.

Japanese culture-related lists
Shinto shrines in Hiroshima Prefecture
Shinto shrines in Shiga Prefecture
Shinto shrines in Kanagawa Prefecture